John Henry "Joby" Blanshard (7 November 1919 – 26 November 1992) was an English film and television actor, most famous for playing Colin Bradley in 32 episodes of the early 1970s "science-fact" series, Doomwatch.

Filmography
 The Passing Stranger (1954) - (uncredited)
 Breakout (1959) - Prison officer (uncredited)
 Hell Is a City (1960) - Tawny Jakes
 Crooks Anonymous (1962) - Peekaboo Doorman
 80,000 Suspects (1963) - Health Inspector Matthews (uncredited)
 West 11 (1963) - Man at Bus Stop (uncredited)
 Moon Zero Two (1969) - Smith
 The Reckoning (1970) - Bottomley
 Doomwatch (1972) - Colin Bradley
 Frenzy (1972) - Man in Crowd (uncredited)
 In the Forest (1978) - Merchant

References

External links

1919 births
1992 deaths
English male film actors
English male television actors
People from Beverley
People from Rotherfield